This is a list of electoral results for the Electoral district of Geelong North in Victorian state elections.

Members for Geelong North

Election results

Elections in the 1990s

Elections in the 1980s

Elections in the 1970s

Elections in the 1960s

References

Victoria (Australia) state electoral results by district